Mylochromis ericotaenia is a species of cichlid endemic to Lake Malawi where it prefers areas with sandy substrates.  This species can reach a length of  TL.  This species can also be found in the aquarium trade.

References

ericotaenia
Fish described in 1922
Taxonomy articles created by Polbot